Aubria subsigillata, commonly known as the brown ball frog or the West African brown frog, is a species of frog belonging to the family Pyxicephalidae. It has a discontinuous distribution from southern Guinea through Liberia and Ivory Coast, and from Nigeria to southern Cameroon, and Equatorial Guinea to Gabon (with, at least apparently, a gap in Togo and Benin). However, the species delimitation differs between sources (see below), and the International Union for Conservation of Nature  has adopted a narrower view where this species only occurs in Cameroon and southward.

Taxonomy
The species currently known as A. subsigillata might represent more than one species. While the Amphibian Species of the World considers A. occidentalis as a synonym of A. subsigillata, other sources recognize it as a valid species. Furthermore, what some sources treat as Aubria occidentalis is actually another species, Aubria masako.

Etymology
The specific name subsigillata is derived from Latin sub, meaning under, and sigillatus, for ornamented with small marks, in reference to the speckled underside of this species.

Description
A. subsigillata is a large, stocky frog; males measure  and females  in snout–vent length. Apart from size, the males and females are quite similar. The dorsum is brown, whereas the underside is speckled white over a brown background; in older individuals, much of the underside is white. The tympanum is relatively small but visible.

Habitat and conservation
Its natural habitats are swamps or along small streams in lowland rainforests, gallery forests, and degraded secondary habitats (farm bush) in the forest zone. It is an adaptable species that is likely to occur in many protected areas and unlikely to face significant threats.

References

subsigillata
Amphibians of Cameroon
Amphibians of Equatorial Guinea
Amphibians of Gabon
Amphibians of West Africa
Taxa named by Auguste Duméril
Amphibians described in 1856
Taxonomy articles created by Polbot